Black and Blue is a 1976 album by The Rolling Stones.

Black and Blue may also refer to:

 A euphemism for bruising of a person's flesh
 Black and bleu, another name for Pittsburgh rare, a way to prepare steak

Film and television

 Black and Blue (1999 film), a television film starring Mary Stuart Masterson
 Black and Blue (2019 film), an American drama film starring Naomie Harris and Tyrese Gibson
 Black and Blue (TV series), a six-part TV comedy-drama series
 "Black and Blue" (Homicide: Life on the Street), a 1994 episode of Homicide: Life on the Street
 "Black and Blue" (Better Call Saul), a 2022 episode of Better Call Saul
 "Black and Blue", episode of Series 1 of Rebus, based on the Ian Rankin book
 "Negro y Azul" a Season 2 episode of the American television series Breaking Bad

Books
 Black and Blue (Quindlen novel), a 1998 novel by Anna Quindlen
 Black & Blue (Rankin novel), a 1997 novel by Ian Rankin
 Black and Blue: A memoir of racism and resilience, a 2021 book by Veronica Gorrie

Music
 Black 'n Blue, a glam metal band
 Black and Blue Festival, an annual circuit party held in Montreal
 Black and Blue (musical), a 1989 Tony Award-winning Broadway musical
 Black and Blue (video) a 1980 video of a concert tour co-headlining Black Sabbath and Blue Öyster Cult
 Black & Blue Records, a French jazz label

Albums

 Black and Blue, a 1962 album by Lou Rawls
 Black & Blue (Harold Melvin & the Blue Notes album), 1973
 Black and Blue, a 1991 album by Gene Harris
 Black & Blue (Backstreet Boys album), 2000
 Blak and Blu, a 2012 album by Gary Clark, Jr.

Songs
 "Black and Blue" (Fats Waller song), 1929
 "Black and Blue" (Chain song), 1971
 "Black and Blue" (Van Halen song), 1988
 "Black & Blue" (Miike Snow song), 2009
 "Black & Blue" (Guy Sebastian song), 2015
 "Black and Blue", by Archive from the album Restriction
 "Black and Blue", by Agnostic Front from the album Warriors
 "Black and Blue", by Air Supply from the album Air Supply
 "Black and Blue", by Brand New Sin from the album Recipe for Disaster
 "Black and Blue", by Bring Me the Horizon from the album Count Your Blessings
 "Black and Blue", by Crystal Lake from the album True North
 "Black and Blue", by Edie Brickell from the album Ghost of a Dog
 "Black and Blue", by Gino Vannelli from the album A Pauper in Paradise
 "Black and Blue", by Ingrid Michaelson from the album Human Again
 "Black and Blue", by Haywire from the album Don't Just Stand There
 "Black and Blue", by Sonic Syndicate from the album We Rule the Night
 "Black and Blue", by Soul Asylum from the album Say What You Will, Clarence... Karl Sold the Truck
 "Black and Blue", by The Walls
 "Black & Blue", by Brand Nubian from the album In God We Trust
 "Blk & Blu", by Chase & Status, 2014

Sports
Inter Milan, the Italian football club is often called "Black and Blue" (Italian: 'Nerazzurri') because of its kit colors
 The NFC North in the National Football League is often called the "black and blue division" for its intense rivalries and rough style of play

See also
The dress (viral phenomenon) with hashtag #blackandblue